The First International Bank of Grenada (FIBG) was an offshore bank that operated between 1996 and 2000, duping thousands of people in a Ponzi scheme. Four people were indicted, the result of a collaborative effort between the FBI and the Internal Revenue Service,  estimating a monetary loss from investors at over $170 million. 

The scheme was first reported by David Marchant, the publisher of OffshoreAlert, a Miami-based newsletter. The bank was put in liquidation with liabilities of $473 million.

References

Banks of Grenada
Pyramid and Ponzi schemes
Confidence tricks